Betty Banafe (born Betty Ibtisam binti Abu Bakar Banafee; 14 November 1979), is a Malaysian singer and actor from Johor Bahru, Johor.

Banafe's family is of Malay, Arab Yemeni, Javanese and Dutch descent. She became an actor despite opposition from her father and attended Universiti Teknologi Mara, where she earned a bachelor's degree in Mass Communications - Public Relations (with honors), despite almost being expelled from University for being 'too active' in the film industry during her years of study.

Personal life
Betty Banafe married Anglo-American businessman and technology consultant, Bruce Dargus on December 12, 2012. She was divorced by her husband on July 4th, 2019 by the utterance of one Talaq before two male Malaysian Muslim witnesses at Sultan Salahuddin Abdul Aziz Mosque in Shah Alam, and again on July 5th, 2019 before two male Malaysian Muslim witnesses in Ampang, by the utterance of a second Talaq.

Music career
Betty Banafe is one of few Malaysian artists that is known for singing in Arabic. Since her full-length album 'Ibtisam' was released, Betty has been making guest appearances at private events.

Filmography

Film

Television series

Telemovie

References

External links
 

1979 births
Living people
Malaysian people of Malay descent
People from Johor
Malaysian actresses
Malaysian people of Arab descent
Malaysian people of Javanese descent
21st-century Malaysian women singers